Acronicta sagittata is a moth in the family Noctuidae (the owlet moths). The species was first described by James Halliday McDunnough in 1940. It is found in North America.

The MONA or Hodges number for Acronicta sagittata is 9273.

References

Further reading

 
 
 

Acronicta
Articles created by Qbugbot
Moths described in 1940